Second-order linear partial differential equations (PDEs) are classified as either elliptic, hyperbolic, or parabolic. Any second-order linear PDE in two variables can be written in the form

A PDE written in this form is elliptic if

with this naming convention inspired by the equation for a planar ellipse.

The simplest examples of elliptic PDE's are the Laplace equation, and the Poisson equation,  In a sense, any other elliptic PDE in two variables can be considered to be a generalization of one of these equations, as it can always be put into the canonical form

through a change of variables.

Qualitative behavior
Since characteristic curves are the only curves along which solutions to partial differential equations with smooth parameters can have discontinuous derivatives, solutions to elliptic equations cannot have discontinuous derivatives anywhere. This means elliptic equations are well suited to describe equilibrium states, where any discontinuities have already been smoothed out. For instance, we can obtain Laplace's equation from the heat equation  by setting . This means that Laplace's equation describes a steady state of the heat equation.

In parabolic and hyperbolic equations, characteristics describe lines along which information about the initial data travels. Since elliptic equations have no real characteristic curves, there is no meaningful sense of information propagation for elliptic equations. This makes elliptic equations better suited to describe static, rather than dynamic, processes.

Derivation of canonical form
We derive the canonical form for elliptic equations in two variables, .

If , applying the chain rule once gives

a second application gives

 and

where

 and

This gives us the system of equations

Adding  times the second equation to the first and setting  gives the quadratic equation

Since the discriminant , this equation has two distinct solutions,

which are complex conjugates.

into the canonical form

as desired.

In higher dimensions

A general second-order partial differential equation in  variables takes the form

Unlike the two-dimensional case, this equation cannot in general be reduced to a simple canonical form.

See also 
 Elliptic operator
 Hyperbolic partial differential equation
 Parabolic partial differential equation
 PDEs of second order (for fuller discussion)

References

External links
 
 

Partial differential equations